Franklin District was a New Zealand territorial authority that lay between the Auckland metropolitan area and the Waikato Plains. As a formal territory it was abolished on 31 October 2010 and divided between Auckland Council in the Auckland Region (39.82 percent by land area) to the north and Waikato and Hauraki districts in the Waikato region (60.18 percent) to the south and east. The Auckland portion is now part of the Franklin ward, which also includes rural parts of the former Manukau City.

Before its abolition, it was administered from the town of Pukekohe. Out-going Franklin District Mayor Mark Ball had proposed that Franklin district become an independent unitary authority, fulfilling both the functions of a local and regional council. However, this was rejected by Minister Rodney Hide.

Location and extent

The district was bounded in the north by the start of the Auckland metropolitan area and the waters of the Manukau Harbour. Awhitu Peninsula stretches up the Tasman coast to the mouth of this harbour. Here are located several holiday spots, such as Karioitahi Beach and Matakawau.

To the south, Franklin was bounded by the fertile lowlands of the Waikato Plains. In the east, the land rises to the Hunua Ranges, then falls to the coast of the Firth of Thames. In the west is the Tasman Sea.  The Waikato River mouth is at Port Waikato in the south of the region. This is renowned as a good place for surfcasting.

The area is mainly rural, with local settlements such as Waiuku and Tuakau supporting the farming industry. One industry of note is the New Zealand Steel steel mill at Glenbrook, north of Waiuku.

Mayors
Six people served as mayor of Franklin District during its 21-year existence:

Nomenclature 
The name of "Franklin" probably derives from Lady Jane Franklin, an early British traveller and the wife of Captain Sir John Franklin,
who served as Lieutenant-Governor of Van Diemen's Land (1837–1843). Lady Franklin visited the Waikato Heads in 1841.

Media
Franklin County News, a twice-weekly newspaper based in Pukekohe, serves the former Franklin district. The Post Newspaper distributes 26,000 printed copies weekly on a Tuesday covering Franklin and North Waikato. The Post Newspaper has an office in both Pukekohe and Waiuku. In 2015, the online events calendar and photo news Franklin Life NZ was launched.

Populated centres
Here are some of the following suburbs, towns, villages and other settlements within the former Franklin District's territorial area borders, grouped into their present-day adjacent areas:

Northern Franklin (now part of Auckland Super-City)
 Wattle Bay, Orua Bay, Big Bay, Grahams Beach, Awhitu, Kauritutahi, Matakawau, Matakawau Point, Clarks Beach, Pollok, Te Toro, Glenbrook Beach, Waiau Beach, Mission Bush, Karioitahi, Waiuku, Kingseat, Waiau Pa, Patumahoe, Te Hihi, Karaka, Roseneath Road, Paerata, Pukekohe, Bombay, Ararimu, Hunua, 
Southern Franklin (now part of Waikato District)
 Otaua, Aka Aka, Tuakau, Buckland, Paparimu, Pōkeno, Port Waikato, Mercer, Mangatāwhiri, Onewhero, Pukekawa, Glen Murray, Naike, Mangatangi, Limestone Downs
North Eastern Franklin (now part of Hauraki District)
 Waharau, Whakatīwai, Kaiaua, Miranda

References

External links
 Franklin ward, Auckland Council
 Franklin Life NZ

Populated places established in 1989
2010 disestablishments in New Zealand
Former subdivisions of the Auckland Region
Former districts of New Zealand
Politics of the Auckland Region